Lokapur  is a village in the north  state of Karnataka, India. It is located in the Mudhol taluk of Bagalkot district and belongs to Belgaum Division in Karnataka.

Demographics
 India census, Lokapur had a population of 10865 with 5444 males and 5421 females.

See also
 Bagalkot
 Districts of Karnataka

References

External links
 https://web.archive.org/web/20140905213715/http://globaltravelwiki.com/india/lokapur-karnataka/
 http://Bagalkot.nic.in/

Villages in Bagalkot district